Dyachkovo is a rural locality (a village) in Argunovskoye Rural Settlement, Nikolsky District, Vologda Oblast, Russia. The population was 52 as of 2002.

Geography 
Dyachkovo is located 45 km northwest of Nikolsk (the district's administrative centre) by road. Sofronovo is the nearest rural locality.

References 

Rural localities in Nikolsky District, Vologda Oblast